Moses Owoicho Ogbu (born 7 February 1991) is a Nigerian footballer who plays as a forward for China League One side Shaanxi Chang'an Athletic

Ogbu has spent the majority of his professional career playing in Sweden and has had spells with IK Sirius, Jönköpings Södra and Mjällby AIF. He has also played in England with Grimsby Town and in Saudi Arabia with Al-Ain, in South Korea with Pohang Steelers and in China for Wuhan Three Towns and Shaanxi Chang'an Athletic

Career

Growing up in Nigeria, Ogbu arrived in Sweden in February 2009, when he joined for Djurgården 's Under-21 team on trial , with whom he played a few games, always at a youth level. During the same calendar year he also played in the fifth Swedish series with Gimo IF.

In October 2009 he joined IK Sirius on trial , a team that a few days later would be relegated to Division 1 but managing to secure a contract for the following season. During the 2013 season he was the top scorer in Division 1 with his 18 goals, as Sirius won be promotion to Superettan. At the end of the 2015 season, Sirius lost in the play-off's against Falkenbergs FF with Ogbu scored a brace in the 2-2 home match of the first leg.

Ogbu signed for Jönköpings Södra at the beginning of the 2016 season following the clubs promotion to the Allsvenskan. Ogbu made 12 appearances in the Swedish top flight without scoring.

In the summer transfer window he returned to the Sirius on loan, helping his team with three goals to find that promotion to Allsvenskan. Following the end of the loan, Ogbu remained with Sirius on a permanent deal following a mutual decision with Jönköpings to terminate his contract. In the 2018 season he scored with 7 goals in 28 games, but chose to renew his contract at the end of the year 

On 3 February 2019, Ogbu signed a half-year contract with Saudi Arabian Second Division club Al-Ain.

On 25 June 2019, Ogbu signed for EFL League Two side Grimsby Town on a one-year deal. On 14 January 2020, Ogbu was released from his contract at Grimsby, with manager Ian Holloway stating "I believe that he needs to go back to where he came from and see if he can be happy again. The boy took it brilliantly. He admitted that he hasn't seen his family in Nigeria for over a year, so we had a big hug at the end of it and I told the lads that." Ogbu had scored four goals in twenty-five appearances for The Mariners in all competitions

Ogbu returned to Sweden on 9 March 2020 signing with Mjällby AIF. During the spell he was the third top scorer in the League with 14 goals in 25 appearances as his side finished 5th in Sweden's top flight.

On February 26, 2021 Ogbu signed with China League One side Wuhan Three Towns.

On 15 February 2022, Ogbu signed with K League 1 side Pohang Steelers.

On September 1, 2022, he joined Shaanxi Chang'an Athletic of China League One.

Personal life
Ogbu holds dual-nationality and has both Nigerian and Swedish passports.

References

External links

1991 births
Living people
Nigerian footballers
Association football forwards

IK Sirius Fotboll players
Jönköpings Södra IF players
Al-Ain FC (Saudi Arabia) players
Grimsby Town F.C. players
Mjällby AIF players
Wuhan Three Towns F.C. players
Pohang Steelers players
Shaanxi Chang'an Athletic F.C. players

Superettan players
Allsvenskan players
Saudi First Division League players
English Football League players
China League One players
K League 1 players

Nigerian expatriate footballers
Expatriate footballers in Sweden
Nigerian expatriate sportspeople in Sweden
Expatriate footballers in Saudi Arabia
Nigerian expatriate sportspeople in Saudi Arabia
Expatriate footballers in England
Nigerian expatriate sportspeople in England
Expatriate footballers in China
Nigerian expatriate sportspeople in China
Expatriate footballers in South Korea
Nigerian expatriate sportspeople in South Korea